Mark Beachum is an American comic book artist, writer, painter, publisher, photographer and filmmaker known for beautiful, dynamic and highly erotic renditions of the female figure. Having worked for Marvel, DC, Continuity among others, his most notable credits include work in Web of Spiderman, Samuree, Vampirella, Penthouse Comix, Razmataz, Alienzkin and Supergurlz.

Michael Bair summarizes Beachum:

Beachum has often expressed that superheroes are an erotic idiom, and that he is not interested in writing/drawing for children. Beachum is known for drawing sexy. It can be men or women, but in his art everyone looks beautiful. In New Talent Showcase, Mark is said to be influenced by Frank Frazetta, Hal Foster, Trevor Von Eeden, Michael Jackson, Neal Adams, and Alex Toth. He is also known in the industry as the kind of person who will do what he wants when he wants to, here is what Christopher Priest has to say about that:

Early life 
Mark Beachum was born in New York city. He dropped out of the High School of Art & Design and continued his artistic development as an autodidact.

He worked at the Soundscape jazz club as he was making his way into the comic industry.

Career

DC 
In 1981 he came up to DC Comics and showed his portfolio to then-art director Dick Giordano, a short time after he was commissioned to draw a Batgirl story that for some reason was never published. However in 1984 there was the Jenesis story on the New Talent Showcase, penciling a Wonder Woman story and the Huntress backup in Wonder Woman.

Marvel 
Many covers for The Spectacular Spider-Man and Web of Spider-Man from the late 80s were created by Beachum. Together with Peter David over at Marvel, he created Spider-Man's adversary Ace, a badass street character, which contrary to most places reporting was not based on the musician Prince nor Michael Jackson, in fact Ace was modeled after Beachum himself.

Continuity Comics 
From the late 80s to early 90s Beachum is working with Neal Adams at Continuity Comics where he was doing both comics and commercial advertising art work. He became most notable for drawing the Samuree story while there; at the same time he also worked on Michael Jackson Pepsi commercial storyboards and animatics. Mark warmly recounts and regards the time spent around Neal Adams at Continuity Publishing, as the place where all kinds of creativeness intersected and the place he wanted to be.

Peter Stone, editor and writer at Continuity describes Beachum's dynamic in the studio:

Aja Blu 
In 1990 Mark Beachum co-created an independent label Aja Blu Comix along with a comic world debutante Sandra Chang, who although a beginner, was among the first self-published Asian American female indie comic creators and definitely one of the first women in the erotic comics field.The two of them did all that was required: wrote, edited, penciled, inked, produced, published... to self-publish the Achilles Storm/Razmataz books.

Penthouse 
At the time of its existence Penthouse Comix had the highest paying rate for comics and was priding itself on hand picking the best artists and in mid 90s Beachum painted the futuristic story Backlash written by Tom Thornton for them. Then he published his art portfolio FemmErotiSexiVision in the magazine as well as two stories Nightclaw and Latex Diva ,which appeared in later issues of Penthouse Comix. The stories were painted as well as written by Beachum.

Other 
In the early 90s Beachum was friendly with Horatio Weisfeld and did cover art for his Bullet Comics publications Radrex and BIO 90.

In 1994 he illustrated the Syphons story written by Allen Curtis. Originally published in color as a three issue mini-series by NOW Comics, a decade later in 2004 it was republished by Image Comics as a black and white graphic novel.

Around the time of working for Continuity and Penthouse, he began submitting fully painted art thus eliminating the need for either inker or colorist. The art would be produced using watercolors, acrylics, graphite, ink, markers or any mixture necessary to achieve the desired effect.

In the early 2000s when the Alienzkin GN came out, there was a new look to Beachum's work, he started using CG to add yet another dimension to his art.

Beachum created original characters for his Razmataz and Alienzkin books and shared his ideas about independent publishing with others. Hart D. Fisher cites Beachum as his inspiration to go independent and create his own company, Boneyard Press, after Beachum said to him: “Why do you want to spend all of your artistic energy on something someone else owns?”

Art Collectors 
Mark Beachum created a logo for Sizzle magazine of NBM Publishing. Sizzle was the first place where his Alienzkin story was published over the course of three issues in 1999 (originally it was supposed to be called Razor Burn). NBM was in the process of moving to a new location, after the move they discovered that the original artwork for Alienzkin story was lost.

Beachum's artworks are numerous on the collectors' market, a good portion of them were sold off without artist's permission on eBay.

Fellow comic artist Michael Bair collects Beachum art and tells that he would get paid with Mark Beachum art by Anubis Press. Beachum and Bair have done much work together; however, there appears to be some animosity between them.

Vampirella 
Beachum produced Vampirella work and covers during the Harris era, some of the art consisted of paintings and photography mixed media art.

In 2019 he was approached to make a variant Vampirella cover for the upcoming Black History Month in which Vampirella would be portrayed as a black character, Christopher Priest and Matt Idelson were putting that idea together. Here is what Beachum had to say about his history with the character:

Photography and Filmmaking 
Sometime in the 90s Beachum started holding photo shoots for art reference and to include in his multimedia creations. He would shoot film and had models cosplaying as characters for him before it became mainstream.

Over the years he created numerous album covers and promotional photo shoots for artists and bands, among them: Mark Wood, The kHz, Natasha Komis, Illuminated ft Zen, Soco Fa Sho.

In 1996 together with artist Kristina Marie a.k.a. Glitterfist, Beachum puts out a portfolio of black and white erotic themed photos called FemmErotiSexiVision under his own label Elektrik Ladyland (play on Electric Ladyland album by Jimi Hendrix), Beachum autographed those as "Diamond". That same year, again with Kristina Marie, Beachum takes part in a music video shoot for the song "Boom N' Bust" by then unknown in America Japanese actor Masatoshi Nagase working to promote his music career. The video was directed by Hal Hartley. Both Beachum and Kristina Marie look very edgy, he sports blond hair and she is wearing a fetish-wear PVC catsuit designed by Beachum, made by Madonna's designer.

Somewhere in mid 2000s from photography he is segued into yet another venture, this time it's film. On his websites he showcases previews of his film work, they appear to be a mixture between neo-noir and art-house that look inspired by Helmut Newton, Bob Carlos Clark, David Lynch, Shinya Tsukamoto.

In 2011 Beachum was cited to direct a short film based on Heroic Publishing's superheroine Flare. Heroic Publishing held a successful crowdsource campaign to fund the film.

Bibliography

DC 
 Wonder Woman #310, 314-318 (1983–84)
 New Talent Showcase #8-10 (1984)
 Thriller #7 (1984)
 Elvira's House of Mystery #4-6 (1986)
 The Outsiders #12 (Halo, Looker) (1986)
 Who's Who: Update '87 #3 (1987)
 Young All-Stars #12 (1988)
 Tales of the Teen Titans #90 (1988)
 The Comet #7 (Impact Comics, 1992)
 Jaguar #7-8, 10-11 (Impact Comics, 1992)
 The Ray #1 (1992)
 Green Lantern: Mosaic #9 (1993)

Marvel 
 The Spectacular Spider-Man Annual #5-6 (1984-1985)
 Moon Knight: Fist Of Khonshu #6 (1985)    
 The Spectacular Spider-Man #106, 112, 115, 120-121 (1985-1986)
 The Official Handbook Of The Marvel Universe #2, 7, 11 (1986)
 The Amazing Spider-Man Annual #20 (1986) 
 Web of Spider-Man #11-16, 22 (1986-1987)
 Mark Hazzard: Merc #5 (1987)
 Marvel Age #47 (1987)
 Spider-Man / Dr. Strange: The Way To Dusty Death GN (1991)
 Hellstorm: Prince of Lies #1 (1993)
 Beavis & Butt-Head #10 (1994)
 Iron Man 2020 (1994)
 Spider-Man Saga vol.2 #1 (2010)
 Amazing Spider-Man Epic Collection: Kraven's Last Hunt (2017)
 Moon Knight Omnibus Vol. 2 (2022)

Continuity 
 Samuree #1-7, 9 (1987-1991)
 Ms. Mystic #5 (1990)

Aja Blu Comix 
 Achilles Storm Featuring Razmataz #1-4 (1990-1991)

Penthouse comix 
 Penthouse Comix #4-11 (Backlash) (1994-1996)
 Penthouse Comix #12 (Cover, Nightclaw story) (1996)
 Penthouse Comix #32 (Latex Diva) (1998)

Hero Comics/Heroic Publishing 
 Flare #1-7, 43-44, 47-48 (1988-2019)
 Flare First Edition #1-4 (1991-1993)
 Rose #1-3 (1992–93)
 Flare Trade Paperback #1-2 (2007)
 Liberty Comics #2 (2007)
 Flare Annual #2 (2009) 
 Anthem #5 (2011)
 Flare Adventures #8-9, 31 (2012)
 Tigress #7 (2016)
 Sensational G-Girl #2, 5, 7 (2017-2022)

Vampirella: Harris/Dynamite 
 Vampirella of Drakulon #5 (1996)
 Vampirella: Sad Wings of Destiny (1996)
 Vampirella of Drakulon #5 (1996)
 Vampirella: Death & Destruction LE #1 (1996)
 Vampirella: Silver Anniversary Collection #1, 2B, 3B (1997)
 Vampirella/Dracula: The Centennial (1997)
 Vampirella Monthly Series Preview Edition #1 (1997)
 Vampirella: Silver Anniversary Collection #1-4 (1997)
 Vampirella Dracula and Pantha Showcase #1 (1997)
 Vampirella Crossover Gallery #1 (1997)
 The Best of Vampirella #1 – Lost Tales (Harris Comics, 2008)
 Art of Vampirella HC (Dynamite, 2010) 
 Vampirella Masters Series Vol. 2: Warren Ellis (Dynamite, 2010)
 Vampirella #8 1:75 (Dynamite, 2020)
 Vampirella (Vol. 5) #8 (Dynamite, 2020)

Eros 
 Razmataz GN (Eros Comix, 2001)
 Alienzkin GN (Eros Comix, 2003)

Self Publishing 
 Synthetik XS v1 (2009)
 Supergurlz: In Trouble v1 (2011)
 Razorgurlz (2014)
 Syllabus Erotique [module 1] (2017)

Other Publishers 
 Black Diamond #1 (AC, 1983)
 Ninja #1 Special (Eternity Comics, 1987)
 Danse #1 (Blackthorne Publishing, 1987)
 Delirium #1 (Metro Comics, 1987)
 Halo Jones #8-9 (Quality Comics, 1987)
 Ex-Mutants: The Shattered Earth Chronicles #8 (Eternity Comics, 1987)
 The A1 True Life Bikini Confidential #1 (Atomeka Press, 1990)
 Radrex #1-3 (Bullet Comics, 1990)
 Green Hornet #24 (NOW Comics, 1991)
 Raw Media Mags #1 (Rebel Studios, 1991)
 BIO 90 #1 (Bullet Comics, 1992)
 The Choke #1 LE (Anubis Press, 1992)
 Black Dominion #2 (Anubis Press, 1993)
 WildC.A.T.s Trilogy #3 (Image Comics, 1993)
 Syphons Preview Edition (NOW Comics, 1994)
 Syphons #1-3 (NOW Comics, 1994)
 Hustler Comix vol.2 #1 (Web of the Black Tarantula story) (LFP Inc., 1998)
 Stain #1 (Robot Print)  (Fathom Press, 1998)
 Forbidden Zone #1 (Galaxy Publishing, 1999)
 Sizzle #3-5 (Alienzkin) (NBM Publishing, 1999)
 Faust: Singha’s Talons #0.5, 1 (Avatar Press, 2000)
 Alter Ego #9 (TwoMorrows Publishing, 2001)
 Syphons GN (Image Comics, 2004)
 Agent Wild Union Fall #1 (Dork Empire, 2020)

Portfolios 
 Strength of Man (BlackThorne Publishing, 1986)
 Midnight Silk together with Rick Bryant (S.Q. Productions, 1987)
 Femmerotisexivision: the erotic art of Mark Beachum(Elektrik Ladyland, 1996)

References 

Marvel Comics people
DC Comics people
Pin-up artists
Fetish artists
American erotic artists
American painters
American comics artists
American comics writers
20th-century American artists
21st-century American artists
African-American comics creators
American comics creators
American film directors
African-American film directors
Year of birth missing (living people)
Living people